The 1889 Wake Forest Baptists football team was an American football team that represented Wake Forest College as an independent during the 1889 college football season. Led by W. C. Riddick in his second and final season as head coach, the Baptists compiled a record of 2–2.

Schedule

References

Wake Forest
Wake Forest Demon Deacons football seasons
Wake Forest Baptists football